Scott Emmerson (born 10 October 1982) is an English former professional footballer who played as a striker in the Football League for York City, and in non-League football for Blyth Spartans.

References

External links

1982 births
Living people
Sportspeople from Durham, England
Footballers from County Durham
English footballers
Association football forwards
York City F.C. players
Blyth Spartans A.F.C. players
English Football League players